Stenoma biseriata is a moth in the family Depressariidae. It was described by Philipp Christoph Zeller in 1877. It is found in Central America.

References

Moths described in 1877
Stenoma
Taxa named by Philipp Christoph Zeller